Dezhou or De Prefecture was a zhou (prefecture) of the Khitan-ruled Liao dynasty of China centering on modern Liangcheng County, Inner Mongolia, China. It was created in 1019.

References
 

Prefectures of the Liao dynasty
Former prefectures in Inner Mongolia